The names and titles of Muhammad, names and attributes of Muhammad, Names of Muhammad are the names of the Islamic prophet Muhammad and used by Muslims, where 88 of them are commonly known, but also countless names which are found mainly in the Quran and hadith literature. The Quran addresses Muhammad in the second person by various appellations; prophet, messenger, servant (abd) of God.

Names

Muhammad 
The name Muhammad means "praiseworthy" and appears four times in the Quran. Chapter Surah 47 of the Quran is "Muhammad". The name Abū al-Qāsim Muḥammad ibn ʿAbd Allāh ibn ʿAbd al-Muṭṭalib ibn Hāshim, begins with the kunya Abū, or, father of.

The Quran also refers to Muhammad as Ahmad, "more praiseworthy". The penultimate prophet in Islam, Isa ibn Maryam also refers Muhammad as Ahmad in the Sura As-Saff.
Muhammad is also referred to as Hamid, or "Praiser (of God)", and as Mahmud, or "Most Highly Praised".

Titles
Muhammad is often referenced with these titles or epithets:

Seal of the prophets  
The Prophet,, also, the Prophet of Prophets.
Messenger of God, 
The Beloved or The Beloved of God
The Chosen or The Appointed
The Genuine, The Trustworthy, or The Faithful
The Honest, The Righteous, or The Truthful
Kind, Compassionate, or Affectionate
Model (of Conduct, Merit, or Virtue)
The Perfect
The Best of Mankind
Mercy to the Worlds
al-Mubashir, "The Bearer of Good Tidings"
an-Nadhir, "The Warner"
al-Mudhakkir, "The Reminder"
ad-Dā‘ī, "The One Who Calls (unto God)"
al-Bashir, "The Announcer"
an-Nūr, "The Light Personified"
al-Misbah, "The Lamp/ Lantern" (lit. "Bringer of Light – Dawn") – i.e.: as-Siraaj al-Muneer, "The Lamp of Illuminated, Ever-glowing, Ever-Enlightening, Incandescent"
as-Siraaj, "The Lamp/ Lantern" – i.e.: as-Siraaj al-Muneer, "The Lamp of Illuminated, Ever-glowing, Ever-Enlightening, Incandescent"
Ni‘mat-Ullah, "The Divine Favour"
al-Ummiyy, "The Unlettered and Illiterate", i.e.: An-Nabiyyu l-Ummiyy, "The Prophet who is Unlettered and Illiterate"
al-'Aqib, "The Last (Prophet)"
al-Mutawakkil, "The One who Puts his Trust (in God)"
al-Mahi, "The Remover (of Disbelief)"
al-Hanif, "The One of Primordial Religion"
Nâbîyyu at-Tawbah, "The Prophet of Penitence"
al-Mu`azzaz, "The Strengthened One, the One Made Invulnerable"
al-Muwaqqar, "Held in Awe"
al-Fatih, "The Opener"
al-Hashir, "The Gatherer (First to be Resurrected) on the Day of Judgement"
al-Shafî`, "The Intercessor"
Kareem, Noble and Generous,
Shahid/Shahed, A Witness
al-Mushaffa`, The One Whose Intercession Shall be Granted
al-Mujtaba, The Chosen
‘Abd’Allah, Servant of God
Akhir, 'The Final, that is, the final prophet, "Last Messenger"

Muhammad is sometimes addressed by designations deriving from his state at the time of the address: thus he is referred to as the enwrapped (Al-Muzzammil) in Quran  and the shrouded (al-muddaththir) in Quran .

He is also known by these epithets:
Ibn ‘Abd al-Muttalib, descendant of Abd al-Muttalib
Abu ’l-Qasim (father of Qasim ibn Muhammad), a son by his first wife Khadija bint Khuwaylid.
Abu ‘Abd’Ullah, father of Abdullah ibn Muhammad, also a son by Khadija.
Abu Ibrahim, father of Ibrahim ibn Muhammad, a son by Maria al-Qibtiyya.
Abu ’t-Tahir, father of the Pure
Abu ’t-Tayyib, father of the Pleasant

In Iran, Central Asia and South Asia, Turkey and the Balkans, he is often called Hadrat (His Presence or His Holiness) ) or Messenger.

See also

 Names and titles of Jesus in the Quran
Islamic honorifics
Salawat
Mawlid
Na`at
Madih nabawi
Haḍra
Dala'il al-Khayrat

References

Further reading 
Chiabotti, Francesco, Names, in Muhammad in History, Thought, and Culture: An Encyclopedia of the Prophet of God (2 vols.), Edited by C. Fitzpatrick and A. Walker, Santa Barbara, ABC-CLIO, 2014. 

Titles of Muhammad